Ile des Cendres (also known as Veteran) is a group of submarine volcanoes located off the southeast coast of Vietnam,  southeast of Phan Thiết.  wide and  high volcanoes are characteristic for this volcanic group.

The volcanism relates to a still ongoing regimen of crustal extension. Argon-argon dating has yielded ages of 800,000 years to 0 on olivine tholeiite; a recent eruption was recorded in 1923 which formed land that was later removed again by the sea. A past eruption in 608 AD might be recorded in the chronicles of the Sui dynasty, while future eruptions could cause tsunamis.

See also
List of volcanoes in Vietnam

References

Volcanoes of Vietnam
Submarine volcanoes
Ephemeral islands
Islands of Vietnam